Duval is a surname of French origin.

Duval may also refer to:
 Duval, a suburb of Armidale, New South Wales, Australia
 Duval High School, Armidale, New South Wales, Australia
 Duval College, University of New England, Australia
 Duval County (disambiguation)
 Duval Street, Key West, Florida, United States
 Mount Duval (New South Wales), Australia

See also
 Duvall (disambiguation)
 Duvel Moortgat Brewery
 Gen. I.H. Duval Mansion
 Saunier Duval–Prodir, a Spanish-based road bicycle racing team